The 1952 Tennessee Tech Golden Eagles football team represented Tennessee Polytechnic Institute—now known as Tennessee Technological University–as a member of the Ohio Valley Conference (OVC) during the 1952 college football season. Led by 25th-year head coach Preston Vaughn Overall, the Golden Eagles compiled an overall record of 9–1 with a mark of 4–1 in conference play, sharing the OVC title with Western Kentucky. Tennessee Tech was invited to the Tangerine Bowl, where they lost to East Texas State. The team's captain was Tom Fann and the alternative captain was Ken Broyles.

Schedule

References

Tennessee Tech Golden Eagles football
Tennessee Tech Golden Eagles football seasons
Ohio Valley Conference football champion seasons
Tennessee Tech